Asiye Özlem Sahin (born 13 August 1976) is a Turkish-born professional boxer, representing Germany, fighting out of Ludwigsburg.

Had her professional debut in 2007, Sahin currently holds a professional record consisting of 25 wins including 8 knockouts, 2 losses and 1 draw at her professional career, as of 2019 March.

As of 2019, she is represented by Eva Dzepina and trained by Sebastian Tlatlik.

Career
Born in Trabzon, Sahin spent her childhood with grandparents, aunts and uncles. She attended "Şubat İlköğretim Okulu", her primary school at her hometown.

She moved to Germany with her family at the age of 11, in 1987, united with her parents and started to learn German language. While studying at vocational school, she began to apprenticeship at German technology-based goods supplier company Bosch, where she works since 1995.

Sahin began to train first in kickboxing discipline in 1998, influenced by her brother Ümit. In 2002, she joined MBC Ludwigsburg (formerly named as KTB Ludwigsburg) and trained by Achim Böhme until 2010.

She chose to represent Germany at amateur level and joined national team in 2006. She won Germany International Amateur Boxing Championships twice in 2005 and 2006. Her amateur record is consisting of 11 wins and 1 loss.

Sahin turned professional in 2007. She started to train along with former Universum Box-Promotion coach Conny Mittermeier. Her encounter against Ukrainian Oksana Romanova taken place at Abdi İpekçi Arena on 5 June 2010 was the first ever women's professional boxing bout in Turkey.

On 21 June 2014, beating Thai Buangern Onesongchaigym at Austrian capital of Vienna, Sahin won the world titles of WIBF and Global Boxing Union (GBU), along with Intercontinental title of World Boxing Federation (WBF).

She was honoured as "Athlete of the Year 2014" by  District Council of Remseck am Neckar, Ludwigsburg.

Her next bout is announced to encounter French boxer Anne Sophie Da Costa on 16 March 2019, in Essen, Germany.

Professional boxing record

Titles

Amateur boxing
2007
 Maj Boxing Cup (48 kg):  2nd
2006
 Germany International Amateur Boxing Championships (48 kg): 1st
 Germany International Amateur Boxing Championships (48 kg):1st
 Bourges - 3 Countries Tournament (48 kg): 1st
 Poland vs Germany Tournament (48 kg): 1st
 BC München Boxing Tournament (49 kg): 1st
2005
Germany International Amateur Boxing Championships (48 kg): 1st
2004
 Germany Amateur Boxing Championships (50 kg): 3rd 
 South Germany Amateur Boxing Championships (52 kg): 2nd 
 Württemberg Regional Amateur Championships (52 kg): 1st

References

External links

 Şahin's Official Website 
 Özlem Şahin on boxrec

1976 births
Living people
People from Ludwigsburg
Sportspeople from Stuttgart (region)
Sportspeople from Trabzon
German women boxers
Turkish women boxers
German female kickboxers
Turkish female kickboxers
Turkish emigrants to West Germany
Naturalized citizens of Germany
Light-flyweight boxers